Soro is the 1987 debut album by Malian Afro-pop artist Salif Keita. The album marks the music of his first period. It was executive produced by Ibrahima Sylla.

Track listing
“Wamba” (Keita) – 4:46
“Soro (Afrika)” (Keita) – 9:52
“Souareba” (Keita) – 4:39
“Sina (Soumbouya)” (Keita) – 4:45
“Cono” (Keita) – 6:00
“Sagni Kegniba” (Keita) – 7:44

Sina 
Keita sings "Sina" for his father who never wanted him to become a singer. Traditionally the caste of griots sing, not a Keita who belongs to the caste of princes, a descendant of Sundiata Keita.

References

1987 debut albums
Salif Keita albums
Mango Records albums